The Tutelo (also Totero, Totteroy, Tutera; Yesan in Tutelo) were Native American people living above the Fall Line in present-day Virginia and West Virginia. They spoke a Siouan dialect of the Tutelo language thought to be similar to that of their neighbors, the Monacan and Manahoac nations. 

Under pressure from English settlers and Seneca Iroquois, they joined with other Virginia Siouan tribes in the late 17th century and became collectively known as the Nahyssan. By 1740, they had largely left Virginia and migrated north to seek protection from their former Iroquois opponents. They were adopted by the Cayuga tribe of New York in 1753. Ultimately, their descendants migrated into Canada.

Name
The English name Tutelo comes from the Algonquian variant of the name that the Iroquois used for all the Virginia Siouan tribes: Toderochrone(many variant spellings). The Tutelo autonym (name for themselves) was Yesañ, Yesáh, Yesáng, Yesą, Yesan, Yesah, or Yesang. This may also be connected with the name Nahyssan, as well as earlier colonial-era spellings, such as Monahassanough (John Smith).
Charles Hanna believed their name, first appearing as Oniasont on 17th-century French maps, to be a variation of the name of the tribe recorded in West Virginia and western Virginia at the same time period, as Nahyssan and Monahassanough, i.e. the Tutelo, a Siouan language speaking people. Others theorize that Honniasont may have been considered an Iroquoian language.

History

17th century 
The Tutelo historic homeland was said to include the area of the Big Sandy River on the West Virginia–Kentucky border, which they called the "Totteroy River." The Iroquois drove them from this region during the later Beaver Wars (c. 1670), after which the Iroquois established the Ohio Valley as their hunting ground by right of conquest. Charles Hanna believed their name, first appearing as Oniasont on 17th-century French maps, to be a variation of the name of the tribe recorded in West Virginia and western Virginia at the same time period, as Nahyssan and Monahassanough, i.e. the Tutelo, a Siouan language-speaking people.

Although previously known to the Virginia colonists by their other names, a form of Tutelo first appeared in Virginia records in 1671, when the Batts and Fallam expedition noted their visit to "Totero Town" near what is now Salem, Virginia. A few years later, the Tutelo joined the Saponi to live on islands located where the Dan and Staunton rivers join to become the Roanoke River. It was just above the territory of the Occaneechi. For a time, the Tutelo had a settlement on the banks of the New River. Many of the sherds collected there and the small triangular points, suggest a mid- to late 16th-century or an early 17th-century date.

Between 1671 and 1701, Tutelo abandoned their homelands and joined the Occaneechi.

18th century 
In 1701, they were noted as living at the headwaters of the Yadkin River in North Carolina. After 1714, the Saponi and Tutelo, collectively known as a Nahyssan, resided at Junkatapurse around Fort Christanna in Brunswick County, Virginia, near the border with North Carolina.

After the signing of the 1722 Treaty of Albany, the Iroquois ceased their attacks upon the Tutelo. In the 1730s, Tutelo people moved north to Shamokin, Pennsylvania, and sought the protection of the Oneida viceroy, Shickellamy. After 1753, the Cayuga formally agreed to take in the Tutelo, who moved to the south side of Cayuga Lake and eastern Cayuga Inlet, near present-day Ithaca, New York.

The Tutelo village of Coreorgonel was located near present-day Ithaca, New York and Buttermilk Falls State Park. There they lived under the protection of the Cayuga until Coreorgonel, along with many other Iroquois towns, was destroyed during the American Revolutionary War by the Sullivan Expedition of 1779. It was retaliation for British-Iroquois raids against the American rebels.

The Tutelo went with the Iroquois to Canada, where the British offered land for resettlement at what became known as the Six Nations of the Grand River First Nation. In 1785, 75 Tutelos lived among 1,200 residents on the Six Nations reserve. They continued to live among the Cayuga and were eventually absorbed by them through intermarriage. The last known full-blooded Tutelo speaker, Nikonha or Waskiteng ("Old Mosquito") died in 1870 at the age of 105. He had given extensive linguistic material to the scholar Horatio Hale, who confirmed the Tutelo language as a Siouan language.

19th century 
Nikonha, or John Key (Tutelo, ca. 1765–1871), also called Gostango or Nastabon, from Canada, was the last recorded speaker of the Tutelo language. Chief John Buck (Onondaga/Tutelo, ca. 1818–1893) was a Haudenosaunee firekeeper at the Oshweken Longhouse on the Six Nations Reserve in Ontario. He recounted Tutelo stories to American ethnologists John Napoleon Brinton Hewitt and Frank Speck.

See also 
 Catawba
 Cheraw
 Moneton
 Occaneechi
 Saponi
 Sewee
 Waccamaw

Notes

References

External link 
 Tutelo war club owned by Chief John Buck, National Museum of the American Indian

 
Cayuga
Indigenous peoples of the Northeastern Woodlands
Extinct Native American tribes
First Nations in Ontario
Native American tribes in Virginia
Native American tribes in West Virginia
Siouan peoples
Six Nations of the Grand River